Clesly Evandro Guimarães (born 28 April 1975, in Barra Bonita), commonly known as Kelly, is a Brazilian football coach and former player who played as an attacking midfielder. He is the current assistant manager of Ceará.

Club statistics

Honours
Paraná State League: 1998, 2000, 2001
Parana State League Cup: 1998
J.League Cup: 2004

External links

 Player profile sambafoot
 CBF
 Guardian Stats Centre
 zerozero.pt
 Kelly Official Site
 globoesporte
 Player Profile in Furacao.com

1975 births
Living people
Brazilian footballers
Brazilian expatriate sportspeople in Japan
Brazilian expatriate sportspeople in Spain
Brazilian expatriate footballers
Association football midfielders
Campeonato Brasileiro Série A players
La Liga players
J1 League players
Clube Atlético Bragantino players
CD Logroñés footballers
CR Flamengo footballers
Club Athletico Paranaense players
FC Tokyo players
Cruzeiro Esporte Clube players
Grêmio Foot-Ball Porto Alegrense players
Al Ain FC players
Expatriate footballers in Spain
Expatriate footballers in Japan
Expatriate footballers in the United Arab Emirates
Club Athletico Paranaense managers
UAE Pro League players
Brazilian football managers
People from Barra Bonita, São Paulo